The 2005 Missouri Tigers football team represented the University of Missouri during the 2005 NCAA Division I-A football season.  The team finished with a 7–5 record, including 4–4 in Big 12 Conference play.  The season culminated with a win over South Carolina in the Independence Bowl.  The team led by head coach Gary Pinkel.

Schedule

References

Missouri
Missouri Tigers football seasons
Independence Bowl champion seasons
Missouri Tigers football